Binatog, also known as bualaw or kinulti, is a Filipino boiled corn dessert topped with freshly grated coconut, butter, and salt or sugar. It is commonly sold as street food in the northern Philippines by vendors known as magbibinatog carrying characteristic large tin cans, similar to taho vendors.

Description
Binatog is made from dried mature waxy corn kernels soaked in saltwater until the kernels puff up. The kernels are then washed and boiled until very soft. They are then placed into a bowl and topped with grated coconut, butter (or margarine), and sugar to taste.

Modern variants of the dish typically use canned Mexican hominy to skip the soaking process, but boiled young corn kernels may also be used. Some variants also use other toppings like coconut milk (gata) or evaporated milk, in which case it becomes known as binatog sa gata.

See also
Ampaw
Binaki
Ginataang mais
List of maize dishes
Maíz con hielo
Pozole

References

Maize dishes
Philippine desserts
Foods containing coconut